Chama District with the headquarters at Chama is the largest district of the Eastern Province in Zambia and includes a large wilderness in the Upper Luangwa valley just north-east of the North Luangwa National Park. It is made up of two constituencies, namely Chama North and Chama South.

Much of the population of Chama District lives close to the Malawi border and shares tribal and cultural links with the people of the northern highlands of that country. The people of Chama belong mostly to the Senga tribe. Members of the Tumbuka tribe also live in Chama. Chisenga, a language similar to ChiTumbuka and Chichewa or Nyanja, is the predominant language spoken.

Agriculture is the leading industry, and maize is the most common crop. Chama is also known as a rice-growing area. Cotton is a lucrative crop for some. Sorghum and soyabeans are also grown. Other common foodcrops include groundnuts, sweet potatoes, pumpkin, cabbage, sunflowers.

As of the 2000 Zambian Census, the district had a population of 74,890 people.

History 
In 2012, President Michael Sata created a new province in Zambia, namely Muchinga Province. Every district of Muchinga Province was formerly part of the Northern Province, except for Chama District, which was formerly part of the Eastern Province.

Nine years later, on 17 November 2021, President Hakainde Hichilema announced his intention to reverse the decision to move Chama District from Eastern Province. President Hichilema officially declared Chama District as part of Eastern Province (no-longer part of Muchinga Province), thereby returning the district to its original province.

References

Districts of Eastern Province, Zambia